Giovanni Frattini (8 January 1852 – 21 July 1925) was an Italian mathematician, noted for his contributions to group theory.

Biography
Frattini entered the University of Rome in 1869, where he studied mathematics with Giuseppe Battaglini, Eugenio Beltrami, and Luigi Cremona, obtaining his Laurea in 1875.

In 1885 he published a paper where he defined a certain subgroup of a finite group.  This subgroup, now known as the Frattini subgroup, is the subgroup  generated by all the non-generators of the group . He showed that  is nilpotent and, in so doing, developed a method of proof known today as Frattini's argument.

Besides group theory, he also studied
differential geometry and the analysis of second degree indeterminates.

See also
Fitting subgroup
Frattini subgroup

Notes

References
 

 Emaldi, M.; Zacher, G., Giovanni Frattini (1852–1925), matematico (in italian), Advances in group theory 2002, 191–207, Aracne, Rome, 2003.

External links
 

1852 births
1925 deaths
Scientists from Rome
19th-century Italian mathematicians
20th-century Italian mathematicians
Group theorists
Sapienza University of Rome alumni